There have been two baronetcies created for persons with the surname Colquhoun ("Cohoon"), one in the Baronetage of Nova Scotia (1625) and one in the Baronetage of Great Britain (1786).

The second baronetcy in 1786 was created to rectify confusion over the first. However, a third branch of the family, the Colquhouns of Tillyquhoun, also continued to assert themselves as baronets until their extinction in 1838. Robert Colquhoun was thus titled the 12th baronet.

History

Colquhoun baronetcy, of Colquhoun (1625) 

The Colquhoun Baronetcy, of Colquhoun in the County of Dumbarton, was created in the Baronetage of Nova Scotia on 30 August 1625 for John Colquhoun.

On 30 March 1704, Sir Humphrey Colquhoun, the fifth Baronet, resigned his baronetcy to the Crown and on 29 April of the same year was granted a new patent, with the old precedence, but with remainder to his son-in-law James Grant and the heirs male of his marriage with Sir Humphrey's daughter.

James Grant succeeded as sixth Baronet according to the new patent and assumed the surname of Colquhoun in lieu of his patronymic. However, in 1719 he resumed the surname of Grant in lieu of Colquhoun. On 24 June 1721 he was created Lord Grant in the Jacobite peerage. Grant notably sat as Member of Parliament for Inverness-shire and Elgin Burghs. The seventh and eighth Baronets also sat as Members of Parliament.

In 1811 the ninth Baronet succeeded as fifth Earl of Seafield through his grandmother Lady Margaret Ogilvy (the daughter of James Ogilvy, 4th Earl of Findlater and 1st Earl of Seafield). On his succession to the earldom of Seafield, he assumed the additional surname of Ogilvy, styling himself Grant-Ogilvy. After the fifth Earl of Seafield's death in 1840, his younger brother and successor as sixth Earl of Seafield, reversed the order of the surnames, styling himself Ogilvy-Grant. The baronetcy remained merged with the earldom of Seafield until the death of James Ogilvie-Grant, 11th Earl of Seafield, in 1915. The baronetcy then passed to Trevor Grant, 4th Baron Strathspey, and remains merged with the title barony of Strathspey (see Earl of Seafield and Baron Strathspey for further history of the title).

It is thus that the Colquhoun baronetcy of 1625 may also be known as the Colquhoun, Grant, Grant-Ogilvy, Ogilvy-Grant and Grant of Grant baronetcy.

Colquhoun baronetcy, of Luss (1786) 

The Colquhoun Baronetcy, of Luss in the County of Dumbarton, was created in the Baronetage of Great Britain on 27 June 1786 for James Colquhoun. He was the fourth son of the sixth Baronet of the 1625 creation. The third and fourth Baronets both represented Dunbartonshire in the House of Commons. The fourth, fifth and seventh Baronets all served as Lord-Lieutenant of Dumbartonshire. The present Baronet is also Chief of Clan Colquhoun.

The family seat is Rossdhu House, near Luss, Dunbartonshire.

List of title holders

Colquhoun baronets, of Colquhoun (1625) 
Sir John Colquhoun, 1st Baronet (died )
Sir John Colquhoun, 2nd Baronet (c. 1622–1676)
Sir James Colquhoun, 3rd Baronet (died c. 1680)
Sir James Colquhoun, 4th Baronet (died c. 1688)
Sir Humphrey Colquhoun, 5th Baronet (died c. 1718)
Sir James Grant, 6th Baronet (1679–1747)
Sir Ludovick Grant, 7th Baronet (1707–1773)
Sir James Grant, 8th Baronet (1738–1811)
Sir Lewis Alexander Grant, 9th Baronet (1767–1840) (succeeded as Earl of Seafield in 1811)
see Earl of Seafield and Baron Strathspey for further succession

Colquhoun baronets, of Luss (1786)
Sir James Colquhoun, 1st Baronet (1714–1786)
Sir James Colquhoun, 2nd Baronet (1741–1805)
Sir James Colquhoun, 3rd Baronet (1774–1836), MP for Dunbartonshire 1799–1806, married Janet Colquhoun
Sir James Colquhoun, 4th Baronet (1804–1873), MP for Dunbartonshire 1837–41, drowned in Loch Lomond
Sir James Colquhoun, 5th Baronet (1844–1907)
Sir Alan John Colquhoun, 6th Baronet (1838–1910) 
Sir Iain Colquhoun, 7th Baronet (1887–1948)
Sir Ivar Iain Colquhoun, 8th Baronet (1916–2008)
Sir Malcolm Rory Colquhoun, 9th Baronet (b. 1947)

The heir apparent is the present holder's eldest son Patrick John Colquhoun, Younger of Luss (b. 1980). The heir apparent's heir apparent is his son Arthur Stewart Colquhoun (b. 2012).

References

Kidd, Charles, Williamson, David (editors). Debrett's Peerage and Baronetage (1990 edition). New York: St Martin's Press, 1990.

Baronetcies in the Baronetage of Nova Scotia
Baronetcies in the Baronetage of Great Britain
1625 establishments in Nova Scotia
1786 establishments in Great Britain
Baronetcies created with special remainders